Mark Ringer (born December 8, 1959) American writer, theater and opera historian, director and actor. Ringer’s books include Electra and the Empty Urn: Metatheater and Role Playing in Sophocles, a critical analysis of theatrical self-awareness in the seven Sophoclean tragedies, Opera's First Master: The Musical Dramas of Claudio Monteverdi, which Alan Rich of the LA Weekly described as "an uncommonly well-told accounting of Monteverdi's operatic legacy",, Franz Schubert's Theatre of Songv and Bach's Operas of the Soul: A Listener's Guide to the Sacred Cantatas. Ringer's work as a director has concentrated on classical plays such as The Alchemist and The Puritan for R. Thad Taylor's Globe Playhouse and Hamlet with Jon Mullich in the title role. Ringer is married to director Barbara Bosch, for whom he played Falstaff in his own adaptation of the two parts of William Shakespeare's Henry IV as well as  Polonius and the Gravedigger in The Heart of My Mystery: The Hamlet Project. His performances for other directors include Malvolio in Twelfth Night, Zeus in Iliad, Nick Bottom in A Midsummer Night's Dream, and Baptista in Taming of the Shrew. Ringer is a Professor of Theatre Arts and holds the title of Distinguished Chair  at Marymount Manhattan College.

Works
 Opera's First Master 
 Electra and the Empty Urn 
 Franz Schubert's Theatre of Song 
 Euripides and the Boundaries of the Human  
 Bach's Operas of the Soul: A Listener's Guide to the Sacred Cantatas

External links
 Mark Ringer biography on Marymount Manhattan Website

References

1959 births
American male stage actors
American theatre directors
Place of birth missing (living people)
University of California, Santa Barbara alumni
University of California, Los Angeles alumni
Living people